This is a list of notable graduates as well as non-graduate former students, academic staff, and university officials of Zhejiang University and its predecessors in China. It also includes those who may be considered alumni by extension, having studied at institutions that later merged with Zhejiang University.

Politics & government

Humanities & culture
Chen Duxiu – communist philosopher, writer
Hu Qiaomu – communist philosopher, writer
Wu Han – historian, writer, playwright
Song Xi – historian, president of Chinese Culture University
Shao Piaoping – journalist, author, revolutionary
Xia Yan –  playwright, screenwriter
Wang Xufeng – writer, tea researcher, Mao Dun Literature Prize winner (2000)
 Wu Guanzhong – painter, Ordre des Arts et des Lettres recipient 1991
Yu Dafu – author, poet
Chen Daqi – polymath, educator, politician
Ho Ping-sung – historian, writer, educator; president of Jinan University
Zheng Xiaocang – writer, educator, translator
He Xie-hou – educator, president of Peking University.

Science & engineering

Mathematical sciences

Chen Jiangong – mathematician
Wang Yuan – mathematician, president of Chinese Mathematical Society
Gu Chaohao – mathematician, president of USTC
Hu Hesheng – mathematician, Noether Lecturer 2002
Zhu Miaolong – mathematician, president of Qingdao University
Chuan-Chih Hsiung – geometrician, founder of Journal of Differential Geometry
Jian-Shu Li – mathematician, president of Hong Kong Mathematical Society 
Shi Zhongci – mathematician
Xia Daoxing – mathematician
Chung Tao Yang – topologist
Yuan-Shih Chow – probabilist
Lin Fanghua – mathematician, Bôcher Memorial Prize winner, 2002
Huang Daren – mathematician, president of Sun Yat-sen University
T. Tony Cai – statistician, COPSS Presidents' Award winner 2008
Pengfei Guan – geometrician
Xu-Jia Wang – mathematician,  Australian Mathematical Society Medal winner 2002
M. T. Cheng – mathematician
Lizhen Ji – mathematician and writer
Jia Rongqing – mathematician
Chen-Bo Zhu – mathematician, president of Singapore Mathematical Society

Meteorology, geology, geography

Ye Duzheng – meteorologist, State Preeminent Science and Technology Award recipient 2005
Hsiao-Lan Kuo – meteorologist, Carl-Gustaf Rossby Research Medal winner 1970
Shi Yafeng – geologist, Father of Chinese Glaciology
Song Xi – geographer
Xie Xuejing – geochemist, AAG Gold Medal winner 2007
Ding Zhongli – Vice-president of Chinese Academy of Science
Chang Jen-Hu – geographer, educator

Physics, material science

Shiyi Chen – physicist
Cheng Kaijia – physicist
He Xiantu – physicist
Tsung-Dao Lee – physicist, Nobel Prize laureate (physics, 1957)
Chien-Shiung Wu – physicist, Wolf Prize winner (physics, 1978)
Zhao Jiuzhang – physicist, Father of Chinese Satellite
Li Zhijian – physicist
Shao Xianghua – metallurgist
Guo Kexin – physicist, metallurgist, crystallographer, Father of Chinese Electron Microscopy
Hu Ning – physicist, educator
 Xu Liangying – physicist, Andrei Sakharov Prize recipient 2008
 Hsin Pei Soh – physicist, educator
 Hu Jimin – physicist, educator
 Wang Ganchang, physicist

Chemistry, biomedical sciences, agricultural sciences

Kwang-Chu Chao – chemist, chemical engineer
Yang Guanghua – chemical engineer, President of China University of Petroleum
Rui-Ming Xu – biophysicist
Wang You – chemist, biochemist
Xu Guangxian – chemist, president Chinese Chemical Society
Huang Minlon – organic chemist, pharmaceutical scientist, Honorary-president of Chinese Pharmaceutical Association
Kun-Liang Guan – biochemist, MacArthur Award winner 1998
Yang Huanming – biologist
Tao-Chiuh Hsu – biologist, the 13th president of American Society for Cell Biology
Binghui Shen – radiobiologist
Yang Fuyu – biochemist, biophysicist, Father of Chinese Membrane Biology
Jiang Ximing – zoologist
Chen Hang – botanist, horticulturist, The Veitch Memorial Medal winner 1990
Yao Zhen – biologist, oncologist, the 1st President of Asian-Pacific Organization for Cell Biology 
Jin Guozhang – pharmacologist
Wei Zheng – pharmaceutical scientist
Qiu Fazu – surgeon, Bundesverdienstkreuz recipient 1985 
Zhu Zuxiang – agricultural scientist
Jay Gan – agricultural & environmental scientist

Computer science

 Tao Yang
 Min Zhu

Engineering

Lu Yongxiang – President of Chinese Academy of Science 
Pan Jiazheng – Vice-president of Chinese Academy of Engineering
Pan Yunhe – Vice-president of Chinese Academy of Engineering
Ye Peijian – Chief Commander and Designer of Chang'e 1
Zhang Libin – roboticist, president of Zhejiang University of Technology
Zhang Yulin – astronautic engineer, president of NUDT
Zhu Zhaoxiang – 1st President of Ningbo University
Du Qinghua – physicist, aeronautic and astronautic engineer
Hu Haichang – Chairman of the Chinese Society of Vibrational Engineering
Li Enliang – civil engineer
Bin He – biomedical engineer
Liangchi Zhang – mechanical engineer
Han Zhenxiang – electrical engineer
Wang Guosong – electrical engineer
Yu Mao-Hong – engineer
Tsen-cha Tsao - engineer and educator

Economic & social sciences

Teng Wei-Zao – economist, educator

Industry & business
Min Zhu – co-founder and former president and Chief technical officer of WebEx
Zhou Chengjian – founder and president of Metersbonwe Group
Cha Chi Ming – industrialist, entrepreneur, philanthropist, Grand Bauhinia Medal winner 1997
Duan Yongping – entrepreneur
Bao Yueqiao – entrepreneur
Zhu Yanfeng – president, First Automobile Works
Zhang Zhixiang – steel magnate 
Lu Guanqiu – vehicle parts magnate
Song Weiping – real estate tycoon
Shi Yuzhu – entrepreneur
Wang Jianzhou – Chairman and CEO of China Mobile
Wang Tianpu – President of Sinopec
Shi Zhengrong – Founder & CEO of Suntech Power
Pete Lau (Liu Zuohu) – Founder & CEO of OnePlus
Alex Zhu (Zhu Jun) - former head of Tiktok

Sports
Zhu Qinan – Shooter, 10 m Air Rifle olympic champion, 2004 Athens
Zhou Suhong –  Volleyball player, member of 2003 World Cup and 2004 Athens Olympic Games team champion.
Sun Yang –  Swimmer, 2010 Asian Games, 2012 Summer Olympics and 2013 World Aquatics Championships gold medalist, Olympic and world-record holder.

References 

People associated with Zhejiang University
History of Zhejiang University